Uninhabited Planet Survive! is a 2003 Japanese anime television series which aired in Japan on NHK from October 16, 2003 to October 28, 2004. It was a 52 episode series, plus 3 specials, produced by Telecom Animation Film and Madhouse Production.

Episode list
All episode titles are lines of dialogue spoken in each of them.

References

Uninhabited Planet Survive!